Thora van Deken is a 1920 Swedish silent drama film directed by John W. Brunius and starring Pauline Brunius, Hugo Björne and Gösta Ekman. The film's sets were designed by the art directors Vilhelm Bryde and Gustaf Hallén.

Cast
 Pauline Brunius as 	Thora van Deken
 Hugo Björne as 	Niels Engelstoft
 Jessie Wessel as	Esther Engelstoft
 Gösta Ekman as Bjerring
 Gösta Cederlund as 	Lars Sidenius
 Oscar Johansson as 	Brandt
 Sam Ask as 	Sandberg
 Mathilda Caspér as 	Housekeeper
 Ellen Dall as 	Sofie Brandt
 Louise Eneman-Wahlberg as 	Nurse
 Bengt Lindström as En pojke ca 4 ar

References

Bibliography
 Sadoul, Georges. Dictionary of Film Makers. University of California Press, 1972.

External links

1920 films
1920 drama films
Swedish drama films
Swedish silent feature films
Swedish black-and-white films
Films directed by John W. Brunius
1920s Swedish-language films
Silent drama films
1920s Swedish films